Eurycampta is a genus of gastropods belonging to the family Cepolidae. 

The species of this genus are found in Central America.

Species
 Eurycampta arctistria (Pfeiffer, 1845) 
Species brought into synonymy
 Eurycampta hidalgonis Döring, 1875: synonym of Epiphragmophora trenquelleonis (Pfeiffer, 1851) (junior synonym)

References

 Bank, R. A. (2017). Classification of the Recent terrestrial Gastropoda of the World. Last update: July 16th, 2017

Cepolidae (gastropods)
Gastropod genera